The second and final season of Harry's Law, a legal dramedy created by David E. Kelley, premiered on NBC on September 21, 2011. Regular cast members during the season include Kathy Bates, Nathan Corddry, Karen Olivo, Mark Valley, and Christopher McDonald. Christopher McDonald was promoted to a main character after season one. Aml Ameen and Brittany Snow left the cast after season one but returned as guest stars in season two. The season was originally going to have thirteen episodes. On October 11, 2011, NBC ordered an additional six scripts, bringing the total to 19.

On November 12, 2011, NBC revealed that Harry's Law will move to Sunday at mid-season. On January 6, 2012, NBC announced a full season order of 22 episodes.

NBC announced that the second season would be the last, effectively canceling the series on May 11, 2012.

Cast

Main cast 
 Kathy Bates as Harriett "Harry" Korn
 Nathan Corddry as Adam Branch
 Karen Olivo as Cassie Reynolds
 Justine Lupe as Phoebe Blake (episodes 15–22)
 Mark Valley as Oliver "Olli" Richard
 Christopher McDonald as Thomas "Tommy" Jefferson

Recurring cast 
 Brittany Snow as Jenna Backstrom
 Aml Ameen as Malcolm Davies
 Jean Smart as Roseanna Remmick
 Alfred Molina as Eric Sanders
 Camryn Manheim as Kim Mendelsohn
 Paul McCrane as Josh "Puck" Peyton
 Irene Keng as Chunhua Lao
 Christian Clemenson as Sam Berman

Episodes

Awards and nominations

64th Primetime Emmy Awards
Nomination for Outstanding Lead Actress in a Drama Series (Kathy Bates)
Nomination for Outstanding Guest Actress in a Drama Series (Jean Smart for episode "The Rematch")

Ratings

References 

General references

External links 
 
 

2011 American television seasons
2012 American television seasons